Mirko Pagliarini (born October 28, 1975 in Velletri) is an Italian professional football player currently playing for S.S. Virtus Lanciano 1924.

He played one game in the Serie A in the 1994/95 season for Genoa C.F.C.

External links
 

1975 births
Living people
People from Velletri
Italian footballers
Serie A players
Serie B players
Genoa C.F.C. players
Pisa S.C. players
U.S. Avellino 1912 players
F.C. Crotone players
U.S. Viterbese 1908 players
S.S. Virtus Lanciano 1924 players
Association football forwards
Footballers from Lazio
Sportspeople from the Metropolitan City of Rome Capital